Brocchinia kaiensis is a species of sea snail, a marine gastropod mollusk in the family Cancellariidae, the nutmeg snails.

Description

Distribution
This marine species occurs in the Arafura Sea, off Indonesia.

References

 Verhecken, A., 1997. Mollusca Gastropoda: Arafura Sea Cancellariidae collected during the Karubar Cruise. Mémoires du Muséum national d'Histoire naturelle 172: 295-323

External links
 MNHN, Paris: holotype

Cancellariidae
Gastropods described in 1997